The governor of San Luis Potosí exercises the role of the executive branch of government in the Mexican state of San Luis Potosí, per the Political Constitution of the Free and Sovereign State of San Luis Potosí. The official title is Gobernador Constitucional del Estado Libre y Soberano de San Luis Potosí (Governor of the Free and Sovereign State of San Luis Potosí).

The governor is democratically elected for a term of six years, and cannot be re-elected. The term begins of September 26 in the year of the election and terminates on September 25, six years later.

The state of San Luis Potosí was established in 1824 as one of the original states of the Mexican federation, and has thus survived all the varying historic systems of the Mexican government. At a certain point in history, San Luis Potosí was a "Department", and as such, the title of the executive varied as well.

List of governors
Gobernadores Constitucionales (Constitutional Governors)
 Carlos Díez Gutiérrez 1877-1898
 Blas Escontría Bustamante 1898-1902
 Blas Escontría Bustamante 1902-1905
 José María Espinosa y Cuevas 1908-1910
 José María Espinosa y Cuevas 1910-1911
 Rafael Cepeda 1911-1913
 Juan G. Barragán Rodríguez 1917-1919
 Severino Martínez Gómez 1919-1920
 Rafael Nieto Compéan 1920-1923
 Aurelio Manrique De Lara 1923-1925
 Abel Cano Villa 1925-1927

 Saturnino Cedillo Martínez 1927-1931
 Ildefonso Turrubiartes 1931-1935
 Mateo Fernández Netro 1935-1938
 Reynaldo Pérez Gallardo 1939-1941
 Gonzalo Natividad Santos Rivera 1943-1949
 Ismael Salas Penieres 1949-1955
 Manuel Álvarez 1955-1958
 Manuel López Dávila 1961-1967
 Antonio Rocha Cordero 1967-1973
 Guillermo Fonseca Álvarez 1973-1979
 Carlos Jonguitud Barrios 1979-1985
 Florencio Salazar Martínez 1985-1987
 Fausto Zapata Loredo 1991
 no data
 Horacio Sánchez Unzueta 1993-1997
 Fernando Silva Nieto 1997-2003
 Jesús Marcelo de los Santos Fraga 2003-2009 
 Fernando Toranzo Fernández 2009-2015 
 Juan Manuel Carreras 2015-2021 
 Ricardo Gallardo Cardona 2021-present 

Gobernadores Interinos (Interim Governors)

 Juan Flores Ayala 1897-1897
 José María Aguirre y Fierro 1906-1906
 Arnulfo Pedroza 1911-1911
 José Encarnación Ipiña 1911-1911
 Antonio F. Alonso 1912-1912
 Cayetano García 1912-1912
 Francisco Romero 1912-1912
 Eulalio Gutiérrez Ortiz 1913-1914
 José Refugio Velazco 1914-1914
 Pablo González Garza 1914-1914
 Ricardo Muñoz 1914-1914
 Herminio Álvarez 1914-1915
 Adolfo Flores 1915-1915
 Emiliano G. Sarabia y M. 1915-1915
 Gabriel Garavia Castro 1915-1915
 José Carlos Kaperowitz 1915-1915
 Vicente Dávila Aguirre 1915-1916
 Federico Chapoy 1916-1917
 Nicasio Sánchez Salazar 1916-1918
 Antonio Vives 1917-1917
 Rafael Castillo Vega 1917-1917
 Severino Martínez Gómez 1918-1919
 Manuel I. Vildósola 1919-1919
 Mariano Flores 1919-1919
 Rafael Segura 1919-1919
 José Santos Alonso 1920-1920
 Pedro Moctezuma 1920-1920
 Rafael Curiel 1920-1920
 Pedro Martínez Noriega 1920-1921
 Ángel Silva 1921-1921
 Gabriel Martínez 1921-1921
 Gonzalo Natividad Santos Rivera 1921-1921
 José Fraga 1921-1921
 José Santos Alonso 1921-1921
 Gabriel Macías 1921-1922
 Alfredo E. Garza 1922-1922
 Ángel Silva 1922-1922
 Manuel Rodríguez 1922-1922
 Pío Mendoza 1922-1922
 Santiago Rincón Gallardo 1922-1922
 Gabriel Macías 1923-1923
 Jorge Prieto Laurents 1923-1923
 Lorenzo Nieto Pro 1923-1923
 Graciano Sánchez Romo 1924-1924
 Hilario Hermosillo 1924-1924
 Octaviano Rangel 1924-1924
 Ricardo Aldape 1924-1925
 Hilario Hermosillo 1925-1925
 Rafael Chávez 1925-1925
 Rutiló Alamilla 1926-1926
 Marcelino Zúñiga 1927-1927
 Timoteo B. Guerrero 1927-1927
 Eugenio Jiménez 1928-1928
 Timoteo B. Guerrero 1928-1928
 Eugenio Jiménez 1929-1929
 Vicente Segura 1929-1929
 Eugenio Jiménez 1930-1930
 Baldomero Zapata 1931-1931
 Ignacio Cuellar 1931-1931
 Luis M. Lárraga 1931-1931
 Aureliano G. Anaya 1934-1934
 Benigno Sandoval 1934-1934
 Rubén Solís 1935-1935
 Arturo Leija 1937-1937
 José Pilar García 1938-1938
 Miguel Álvarez Acosta 1938-1938
 Benito C. Flores 1940-1940
 Celedonio E. Terrazas 1940-1940
 David González 1940-1940
 Luis Aguilera 1940-1940
 Rafael Santos Lazcano 1940-1940
 Felipe Cardiel Reyes 1941-1941
 Hilario Hermosillo 1941-1941
 José Ma. Escobedo 1941-1941
 Agustín Olivo Monsiváis 1958-1959
 Teófilo Torres Corzo 1992-1993

Gobernadores Substitutos (Substitute Governors)

 Juan Flores Ayala 1897-1897
 Blas Escontría Bustamante 1898-1898
 Joaquín Arguinzoniz 1900-1900
 José María Espinosa y Cuevas 1906-1906
 Francisco A. Noyola 1909-1909
 Rafael Cepeda 1911-1911
 Agustín García Hernández 1913-1913
 Arturo A. Amaya 1914-1914
 Camilo Lozano 1914-1914
 Mariano Palau 1914-1914
 Francisco Martínez De La Vega 1959-1961
 Leopoldino Ortiz Santos 1987-1991

See also
San Luis Potosí

San Luis Potosí